Rosamond Grant Langbridge (1880 – 2 July 1964) was an Irish novelist, playwright and poet.

Life
She was born at Glenalla, County Donegal, Ireland, the daughter of Rev. Frederick Langbridge, a writer, poet (The Scales of Heaven) and playwright (The Only Way). She was brought up and educated in Limerick, where her father was
Rector of St. John's, until he resigned due to ill-health in 1921.

She married the writer J. S. Fletcher, with whom she had one child. She contributed to newspapers such as The Manchester Guardian and the Saturday Westminster, amongst others. She died at Mersea, in Essex.

Select bibliography

Among her novels are:

The Flame and the Flood (1903)
The Third Experiment (1904)
Ambush of Young Days (1906)
The Stars Beyond (1907)
Imperial Richenda (1908)
The Single Eye (1924)

Short stories:
The Green Banks of Shannon (1929)

Plays:
The Spell

Poetry:
The White Moth and Other Poems (1932)

Non-fiction:
Charlotte Brontë, a psychological study (1929)

References

External links
 
 
 
 Frederick Langbridge in 'Writers - Fiction' file at Limerick City Library, Ireland

1880 births
1964 deaths
Irish women novelists
People from County Donegal
20th-century Irish writers
20th-century Irish women writers
20th-century Irish novelists